Semioscopis is a moth genus of the superfamily Gelechioidea. It is placed in the subfamily Depressariinae.

Species
Semioscopis aurorella Dyar, 1902
Semioscopis avellanella (Hubner, 1793)
Semioscopis inornata Walsingham, 1882
Semioscopis japonicella Sato, 1989
Semioscopis mcdunnoughi Clarke, 1941
Semioscopis megamicrella Dyar, 1902
Semioscopis merriccella Dyar, 1902
Semioscopis oculella (Thunberg, 1794)
Semioscopis osthelderi (Rebel, 1936)
Semioscopis packardella (Clemens, 1863)
Semioscopis similis Sato, 1989
Semioscopis steinkellneriana (Denis & Schiffermuller, 1775)
Semioscopis strigulana (Denis & Schiffermuller, 1775)

Former species
Semioscopis acertella Busck, 1913

Footnotes

References
  (2009): Semioscopis. Version 2.1, 2009-DEC-22. Retrieved 2012-JAN-24.
  (2004): Butterflies and Moths of the World, Generic Names and their Type-species – Semioscopis. Version of 2004-NOV-05. Retrieved 2012-JAN-24.
  (2010): Markku Savela's Lepidoptera and some other life forms – Semioscopis. Version of 2010-FEB-02. Retrieved 2012-JAN-24.

 
Moth genera
Depressariinae